The BetPlay Cycling Team is a Colombian cycling team founded in 2018. In 2019, the team upgraded to UCI Continental, but returned to being an amateur team in 2020.

Team roster
.

References

UCI Continental Teams (America)
Cycling teams established in 2019
Cycling teams based in Colombia